Donald Richard Bertoia (born February 16, 1940 in Rossland, British Columbia) is a retired middle distance runner from Canada, who represented his native country in the men's 800 metres at the 1964 Summer Olympics in Tokyo, Japan. A resident of Vancouver, British Columbia he claimed the gold medal in the same event and a bronze medal in the 1500 metres at the 1963 Pan American Games in Brazil.

References
 Canadian Olympic Committee
 

1940 births
Living people
People from Rossland, British Columbia
Canadian male middle-distance runners
Pan American Games gold medalists for Canada
Pan American Games bronze medalists for Canada
Athletes (track and field) at the 1962 British Empire and Commonwealth Games
Athletes (track and field) at the 1963 Pan American Games
Athletes (track and field) at the 1964 Summer Olympics
Commonwealth Games competitors for Canada
Olympic track and field athletes of Canada
Pan American Games medalists in athletics (track and field)
Medalists at the 1963 Pan American Games